A team representing England has competed in the European Championships since the second event in 2022.

Competitors in table tennis events are listed as representing England as each home nation of the United Kingdom has separate membership of the European Table Tennis Union which organises the table tennis competition at the European Championships. In all other sports, competitors from England compete as part of the Great Britain and Northern Ireland team.

Medal count

See also
Great Britain at the European Championships
Sport in England
England at the Commonwealth Games
Table Tennis England

References

A
Nations at the 2022 European Championships